The International Mongolia School is a Mongolian international school in Gwangjin-gu, Seoul, South Korea. It serves levels primary school through high school.

References

External links

  

International schools in Seoul
Gwangjin District